Ben Hill Griffin Jr. (October 20, 1910 – March 1, 1990) was a prominent American businessman, citrus producer, politician, and philanthropist who was a native and resident of Florida. He was an alumnus of the University of Florida, a former legislator, one-time candidate for governor, and a patron of college sports and higher education in Florida. Several of his grandchildren remain active in Florida politics. Griffin is the subject of the final chapter of John McPhee's work of creative nonfiction Oranges.

Early life and education 

Griffin was born during a hurricane in the former town of Tiger Bay, near Fort Meade, Florida. He attended Frostproof High School in Frostproof, Florida, where he was responsible for starting the high school football program in 1929. After graduating from high school, Griffin studied economics, marketing, and agriculture at the University of Florida in Gainesville, Florida, where he was a member of Pi Kappa Phi Fraternity (Alpha Epsilon chapter).

Citrus and agri-business 

In 1933, Griffin left the University of Florida, after three years and without earning a degree, to find a job during the Great Depression. He unsuccessfully sought work in New York City, then returned home to Frostproof, Florida and began his business with a  orange grove, a wedding gift from his father, and built it into a citrus business empire.

In 1961, Griffin was named to the board of directors of Atlantic Land & Improvement Company, the land-holding subsidiary of the Atlantic Coast Line Railroad and commonly known as Alico. Alico, Inc. became a publicly traded corporation engaged in citrus fruit, sugarcane and sod production, cattle ranching, and forestry. Griffin acquired a majority of the outstanding stock of Alico in 1972 and became chairman of its board of directors in 1973. Griffin was also chief executive officer of Ben Hill Griffin, Inc., a family-owned business with citrus and other agriculture interests. In 1989, the year before his death, he was ranked 261st on the Forbes 400 list of richest Americans.

Florida politics 

Griffin, a  Democrat, was a member of the Florida Legislature for twelve years—four years in the Florida Senate and eight years in the Florida House of Representatives. In 1974, he lost the Democratic primary for Governor of Florida to Reubin Askew.

Philanthropy 

Griffin and his family have been generous donors to higher education in Florida, especially his alma mater, the University of Florida; over the years, he donated more than $20 million to the university and its athletic programs. In 1989, Florida Field, the university's football stadium, was officially renamed Ben Hill Griffin Stadium at Florida Field. Floyd Hall, one of the university's historic academic buildings, was restored due in part to Griffin's donations and was renamed Griffin-Floyd Hall upon its reopening in 1992. For his support of the Florida Gators sports programs, Griffin was inducted into the University of Florida Athletic Hall of Fame as an "honorary letter winner" in 1982.

Alico Arena, FGCU's indoor sports arena, is named for the company. The elementary school in his hometown of Frostproof is also named for Griffin.

Family and legacy 

When Griffin died in 1990, he was survived by his wife Eleanor, a son, four daughters, and sixteen grandchildren. Griffin's only son, Ben Hill Griffin, III, carried on his father's family business and served as the CEO of Alico until 2004, and Alico was sold in 2014. Griffin's son continues to serve as the chairman of Ben Hill Griffin, Inc., and one of FGCU's primary academic buildings, Griffin Hall, is named for him. Griffin's grandson and namesake, Ben Hill Griffin, IV, serves as the current president of Ben Hill Griffin, Inc., which is one of the member companies of the Florida's Natural cooperative.

Following in the family footsteps, three of Griffin's grandchildren have served in elected political office in Florida.  Republican Katherine Harris, a former member of the Florida Senate, former Florida Secretary of State (best known for her role in the disputed 2000 presidential election), and former United States Representative from Sarasota, is Griffin's granddaughter. Republican J.D. Alexander, a former member of both the Florida House of Representatives and Florida Senate, is his grandson. Republican Baxter Troutman, a former member of the Florida House of Representatives, is also Griffin's grandson.

In 1998, a panel of Florida historians and other consultants named Griffin one of the fifty most important Floridians of the twentieth century.

See also 

 Florida Gators football
 History of Florida
 History of the University of Florida
 List of Pi Kappa Phi alumni
 List of University of Florida alumni
 List of University of Florida Athletic Hall of Fame members

References 

1910 births
1990 deaths
Businesspeople from Florida
Citrus farmers from Florida
Democratic Party Florida state senators
Democratic Party members of the Florida House of Representatives
People from Fort Meade, Florida
University of Florida alumni
20th-century American businesspeople
20th-century American politicians
20th-century American philanthropists